Suttsu may refer to the following places in Japan:

 Suttsu, Hokkaido, a town
 Suttsu District, Hokkaido